DekaBank Deutsche Girozentrale is the central provider of asset management and capital market solutions of the Sparkassen-Finanzgruppe. It is registered in both Frankfurt and Berlin, with main operational headquarters in Frankfurt. It traces its origins to the Deutsche Girozentrale, established in 1918 as a hub for payments within the German savings banks system. 

DekaBank is the central asset manager of the Sparkassen-Finanzgruppe, and one of the largest securities services providers in Germany. As a central provider, the bank bundles its competencies in asset management and financial services in its five business areas of asset management, real estate, services, capital markets and financing. Retail and institutional clients and investors can choose from a wide range of investment products and services. DekaBank cooperates closely with local savings banks and Landesbanks. Additionally, it is represented internationally with branches, subsidiaries and representative offices in eleven countries.

Background

Several other regional giro associations  were subsequently created.

Its capital of 15 million Reichsmarks was provided by the regional  under joint and several liability. DGZ operated cashless payment (giro) transactions and settlement between the regional giro organizations. In 1919, DGZ was also authorized to provide long-term financing to municipalities and to issue municipal bonds. The name "Deutsche Kommunalbank" was consequently added to that of DGZ in 1921, so that its full name became , still known as DGZ. In 1931, DGZ was reorganized together with the broader municipal banking system, and it received a statute of its own in 1932. Even so, the DSGV remained ultimately liable for DGZ. At the same time, the supervision of DGZ was transferred from the Interior Minister of Prussia to the national government of the Weimar Republic. From 1933, the National Socialists used DGZ to cover the steadily growing financial needs for rearmament and later for warfare.

Following the end of World War II, the DGZ head office, in East Berlin, was closed by the Soviet Military Administration. In 1954, it was again named  and resumed full activities, and in 1955 it opened a branch in West Berlin. In 1964-1965, DGZ's head office was relocated from Düsseldorf to Frankfurt.

(Deka)

It launched its first domestic investment fund in November 1956, and its first international fund in February 1962. In 1965, like DGZ, it relocated its headquarters to Frankfurt. In 1988, it established its first foreign subsidiary, Deka International SA in Luxembourg, followed in 1995 by Deka Bank (Schweiz) AG in Zurich. DekaBank GmbH was founded in 1996 as holding entity for the Deka Group.

1999 merger and aftermath

On , DGZ and DekaBank merged to form , which was renamed  in 2002. 

In April 2011, DSGV became the sole owner of DekaBank by purchasing the 50 percent stake owned until then by the Landesbanks.

In November 2014, DekaBank came under the prudential supervisory authority of the European Central Bank as a consequence of European banking union.

In 2015, Deka joined Lloyds Bank and Qatar National Bank in a £705 million senior loan which financed the Qatar Investment Authority’s acquisition of 8 Canada Square in Canary Wharf. That same year, Helaba’s leadership proposed a merger with Deka. In May 2019, both entered into exploratory talks on a merger. Later that year, Deka’s supervisory board instructed management to explore “deeper cooperation” with the bank from January 2020.

In 2016, Deka was one of Germany's main issuers of credit-linked notes.

In 2017, amid the Volkswagen emissions scandal, a German court named Deka as lead plaintiff for 1,470 damages claims against Volkswagen totaling 1.9 billion euros ($2 billion).

See also
 DZ Bank

References

External links

 

Banks based in Frankfurt
Banks established in 1999
1999 establishments in Germany
Banks under direct supervision of the European Central Bank
Government-owned banks